Roberto Pistore (born 20 May 1971 in Monza) is a former Italian racing cyclist.

Major results

1993
1st Gran Premio Capodarco
1994
1st Giro della Valle d'Aosta
1st stage 3 Regio-Tour
1995
1st Giro del Canavese
1st Regio-Tour
1st stage 2
9th Giro di Lombardia
5th Vuelta a España
1996
8th Volta a Catalunya
4th Vuelta a España
1997
1st Uniqa Classic
1st stage 1
1st stage 2 Hofbrau Cup (TTT)

References

1971 births
Living people
Italian male cyclists
Sportspeople from Monza
Cyclists from the Province of Monza e Brianza